Greene County is a county located in the west central portion of the U.S. state of Alabama. As of the 2020 census, the population was 7,730, the least populous county in Alabama. Its county seat is Eutaw. It was named in honor of Revolutionary War General Nathanael Greene of Rhode Island.

As of the 2020 census, the county's population was 81% African American, making it the fourth-most heavily black county by proportion in the United States, and the most black county among all counties located outside of the state of Mississippi. It is documented as one of the unhealthiest counties in the United States, with a population with an obesity percentage of 46.3 percent, the highest of any county in the state, and second to only Claiborne County in the western portion of neighboring Mississippi. The life expectancy there is 74.9 years, over 2 years lower than the national average.

History
Greene County was established on December 13, 1819. Eutaw was established as the county seat in 1838, when the seat was moved from Erie. Eutaw is more centrally located.

Being designated as the seat of government stimulated growth in Eutaw.

Reconstruction era (1865–1876)
In 1867 the Reconstruction legislature organized Hale County, taking much of it from the eastern part of Greene County, plus sections of other neighboring counties. This was a period of continuing insurgency by whites, who attempted to maintain dominance over blacks. The latter comprised a majority in Greene County and others in the Black Belt.

The Greene County Courthouse in Eutaw was burned by arson in 1868, in a year with considerable election-associated violence throughout the South. On March 31, 1870, there were at least two insurgent attacks in Greene County. James Martin, a prominent black Republican, was shot and wounded by unidentified gunmen near his home in Union, Alabama. When a physician tried to remove the bullet to help him, the gunmen interrupted and took Martin away. He was "disappeared", believed dead.

That same night, Republican County Solicitor, Alexander Boyd, a white native of South Carolina and Alabama resident, was murdered by the Ku Klux Klan in his hotel in Eutaw. The prevailing theory by historians for the burning of the courthouse is that the records of some 1,800 suits by freedmen against planters were about to be prosecuted; the fire destroyed the documents. The deaths of Martin and Boyd were typical of the KKK, who attacked Republican officeholders and freedmen sympathizers, in addition to freedmen, especially politicians.

Although Governor William Hugh Smith sent a special agent, John Minnis, to explore these deaths, he said he was unable to identify Boyd's killers. (Minnis later served as US Attorney and prosecuted Klansmen under the Enforcement Acts.) He suggested that the killers had come from Mississippi. A grand jury was called on Boyd's death, but no one was prosecuted. No grand jury was called for Martin's disappearance and presumed death.

In the fall of 1870, two more black Republicans were killed in violence before the election. At a Republican rally on October 25, 1870, attracting 2,000 blacks in Eutaw, white Klansmen attacked the crowd in the courthouse square, leaving at least four blacks dead and 54 wounded. After this, most blacks stayed away from the polls or voted Democratic out of fear of reprisals; the Democratic gubernatorial candidate carried Greene County.

Civil Rights Era (1964–1970)
On July 30, 1969, Greene County made history when it became "the first in the South since reconstruction with both the commission and the school board dominated by Negroes."  Barred from the ballot in the November 1968 general election, the new "National Democratic Party of Alabama" filed suit in federal court and a special election was ordered.  In the new vote, African-American candidates won four of the five seats on the Greene County Commission, and two additional seats on the five-member Greene County School Board, and the Montgomery Advertiser would note the next day that "the election gave blacks control of both major governing bodies— a first in Alabama."  The date of the vote would later be described as "a watershed for black political empowerment in Alabama,", leading to African-American candidates finally winning the right to govern counties where white residents were the minority.

Geography
Over 90% of Greene County's boundaries are dictated by the Tombigbee, Black Warrior, and Sipsey Rivers and much of the county is dominated by the valleys of the three rivers.

Major highways
 Interstate 20/Interstate 59
 U.S. Route 11
 U.S. Route 43
 State Route 14
 State Route 39

Adjacent counties
Pickens County (north)
Tuscaloosa County (northeast)
Hale County (east)
Marengo County (south)
Sumter County (southwest)

Demographics 
In 1867, a chunk of the county and associated population was taken to form Hale County. This resulted in an apparent 40% loss in population between 1860 and 1870. In the 20th century, there were population losses after agricultural decline and the migration of rural workers to cities in other areas.

2020 census

As of the 2020 United States census, there were 7,730 people, 2,951 households, and 1,542 families residing in the county.

2010 census
As of the 2010 United States census, there were 9,045 people living in the county. 81.5% were Black or African American, 17.4% White, 0.2% Native American, 0.2% Asian, 0.3% of some other race and 0.5% of two or more races. 0.8% were Hispanic or Latino (of any race).

2000 census
As of the census of 2000, there were 9,974 people, 3,931 households, and 2,649 families living in the county.  The population density was 15 people per square mile (6/km2).  There were 5,117 housing units at an average density of 8 per square mile (3/km2).  The racial makeup of the county was 19.09% White, 80.34% Black or African American, 0.12% Native American, 0.08% Asian, 0.10% from other races, and 0.27% from two or more races.  0.58% of the population were Hispanic or Latino of any race.

There were 3,931 households, out of which 32.70% had children under the age of 18 living with them, 36.40% were married couples living together, 27.10% had a female householder with no husband present, and 32.60% were non-families. 30.80% of all households were made up of individuals, and 12.30% had someone living alone who was 65 years of age or older.  The average household size was 2.52 and the average family size was 3.16.

In the county, the population was spread out, with 29.20% under the age of 18, 8.90% from 18 to 24, 25.10% from 25 to 44, 22.10% from 45 to 64, and 14.70% who were 65 years of age or older.  The median age was 36 years. For every 100 females, there were 88.40 males.  For every 100 females age 18 and over, there were 79.00 males.

The median income for a household in the county was $19,819, and the median income for a family was $24,604. Males had a median income of $25,707 versus $19,051 for females. The per capita income for the county was $13,686.  About 29.90% of families and 34.30% of the population were below the poverty line, including 44.10% of those under age 18 and 31.60% of those age 65 or over.

Government
Greene County is strongly Democratic, but the nature of the membership has changed since the late 20th century. After the Civil War, conservative whites of the South continued in the Democratic Party. After being emancipated and gaining the franchise, African Americans generally joined the Republican Party of President Abraham Lincoln. After African Americans were disfranchised in Alabama in 1901 and other former Confederate states, the Democratic Party was even more exclusively white in Greene County and throughout the South. In the late 20th century, after civil rights legislation enabled African Americans to vote again, they joined the national Democratic Party. 

The last Republican to win the county in a presidential election was Barry Goldwater in the 1964. It was only one of nine counties to back Goldwater and McGovern, all of which are located in the Deep South.

Communities

City
Eutaw (county seat)

Towns
Boligee
Forkland
Union

Unincorporated communities
Clinton
Crawford Fork
Jena
Knoxville
Mantua
Mount Hebron
Pleasant Ridge
Tishabee
West Greene

See also
National Register of Historic Places listings in Greene County, Alabama
Properties on the Alabama Register of Landmarks and Heritage in Greene County, Alabama

References

Notes

 
1819 establishments in Alabama
Populated places established in 1819
Black Belt (U.S. region)
Tuscaloosa, Alabama metropolitan area
Majority-minority counties in Alabama